Portland Transportation Center is a bus and train station in Portland, Maine, United States, served and run primarily by Concord Coach Lines (18 round-trips a day) and Amtrak Downeaster passenger trains (five round-trips a day). It is also served by Megabus (via Concord Coach Lines), as well as the Greater Portland Metro Bus Route 1 BREEZ express bus service to Brunswick, Maine. The station is open from 4:30 AM to 12:15 AM and from 2:45 AM to 3:15 AM. 

Portland Transportation Center is located in Portland's Libbytown neighborhood, about a half mile west of the former site of Portland Union Station. It is located next to Pan Am Railways' Mountain Branch, formerly the Mountain Division of the Maine Central Railroad. In 2019, the NNERPA Board (which governs the Downeaster service) supported a proposal to relocate the station to the mainline to avoid time-consuming backup moves.  A two-year study by the Maine Department of Transportation endorsed moving Amtrak service from this station to a location near that of Portland's original Union Station, on St. John's Street.

See also
 Union Station (Portland, Maine)

References

External links

Portland Amtrak Station & Transportation Center (USA Rail Guide -- Train Web)

Amtrak stations in Maine
Transit centers in the United States
Stations along Boston and Maine Railroad lines
Railway stations in the United States opened in 2001
Bus stations in Maine
Transportation in Portland, Maine
Transportation buildings and structures in Cumberland County, Maine